Adam Aston (born Adolf Loewinsohn, 17 September 1902, Warsaw, Poland: died 10 January 1993 in  London, England) was a Polish singer, actor, and pianist of Jewish origin. He sang in Polish, Hebrew and Yiddish and was one of the most popular artists in interwar Poland. He often worked with Henryk Wars. He also went under the names Adam Wiński, Adam Stanisław Lewinson, recorded also under names J. Kierski, Adam Winski and Ben-Lewi. He used the name Ben-Lewi when recording in Hebrew.

He debuted at the revue theater (music hall, cabaret) Morskie Oko in Warsaw. He made his first record in 1927; in 1930 he began to work with Henryk Wars at the Morskie Oko cabaret and adopted his stage name of Adam Aston.

He recorded gramophone records for Syrena Rekord, Odeon, Parlophon, Columbia, and Lonora, singing as many as 900 songs between 1930-39. He also appeared in two musical comedy films: Dwie Joasie and Manewry miłosne in 1935. He also sang the Polish version of Cheek to Cheek (Polish title: W siódmym niebie - "In Seventh Heaven").

In 1920, he fought in the Polish–Soviet War. After the outbreak of World War II he was evacuated to the east and performed in Lviv, which was then under Soviet occupation. In late 1941, he joined the Polish II Corps of General Anders as part of the Polska Parada cabaret. In 1944, he fought at the Battle of Monte Cassino in Italy. After the war he lived in Johannesburg, South Africa and in 1960 moved to the United Kingdom.

References

External links 
 
 notes on Aston from GWIAZDOZBIÓR POLSKIEJ PIOSENKI

1902 births
1993 deaths
Jewish cabaret performers
Polish cabaret performers
20th-century Polish Jews
Polish expatriates in South Africa
Polish people of the Polish–Soviet War
20th-century comedians
Polish emigrants to the United Kingdom